These are the team rosters of the nations participating in the women's ice hockey tournament of the 2014 Winter Olympics.

Group A

Canada
The following is the Canadian roster in the women's ice hockey tournament of the 2014 Winter Olympics.

Finland
The Finnish roster for the women's ice hockey tournament of the 2014 Winter Olympics was published on 18 December 2013. The players were picked by the head coach Mika Pieniniemi.

Switzerland
The following is the Swiss roster in the women's ice hockey tournament of the 2014 Winter Olympics.

United States
The following is the United States roster in the women's ice hockey tournament of the 2014 Winter Olympics.

Group B

Germany
On 15 January 2014, head coach Klaus Kathan nominated the following roster:

Japan
The following is the Japanese roster in the women's ice hockey tournament of the 2014 Winter Olympics.

Russia
The following is the Russian roster in the women's ice hockey tournament of the 2014 Winter Olympics.

Head coach:  Mikhail Chekanov    Assistant coach:  Yuri Novikov

Sweden
The following is the Swedish roster in the women's ice hockey tournament of the 2014 Winter Olympics.

See also
Ice hockey at the 2014 Winter Olympics – Men's team rosters

References

rosters

2014